Edwin Arthur Byers  (10 February 1875 – 23 February 1949) was an Australian rules footballer who played with Melbourne in the Victorian Football League (VFL).

Notes

External links 

1875 births
Australian rules footballers from Melbourne
Melbourne Football Club players
Australian military personnel of World War I
1949 deaths
Military personnel from Melbourne